Oriental College, Patna City is a minority degree college in Bihar, India. It is constituent unit of Patliputra University. College offers Senior secondary education, Undergraduate degree in Arts, Science, Commerce and conducts some vocational courses.

History 

The college was established on 21 April 1964 with a goal of providing higher education on par with standard. It is a parent body of the Mohammadan Education Committee, Patna, which was founded in 1882.

Degrees and courses 
College offers the following degrees and courses.

 Senior secondary
 Intermediate of Arts
 Intermediate of Commerce
 Intermediate of Science

The college is affiliated to Bihar School Examination Board for its Intermediate courses.

 Bachelor's degree
 Bachelor of Arts
 Bachelor of Science
 Bachelor of Commerce

Facilities for student 

 Smart Class
 ICT Lab
 Web OPAC (www.ocpclib.org)
 INFLIBNET
 Library Automated with Smart Class
 Boys / Girls Common Room
 Science Lab & Arts lab
 Rainwater Harvesting
 Gymnasium
 Indoor & Outdoor Games
 Cycle / Two Wheeler Parking
 Partially Automated and Computerized Office
 Two Smart Class
 NCC
 NSS
 Medical-Cum-Retiring Room

References 

Universities and colleges in Patna